Hideaway is a 1995 horror film directed by Brett Leonard. It is based on the 1992 novel of the same name by Dean Koontz, and stars Jeff Goldblum, Christine Lahti, Alicia Silverstone, Jeremy Sisto, Alfred Molina and Rae Dawn Chong.

In the film, Goldblum plays a man who dies in a car accident, only to be revived two hours later. After being revived, he experiences frightening visions. He begins to understand that he has become psychically connected to a serial killer, and that by cutting himself, he can actually induce the visions and see through the killer's eyes. However, the vision works both ways, and the killer can also see through his eyes.

Hideaway was released by TriStar Pictures on March 3, 1995. Critical reception was largely negative, and the film was not a financial success.

Plot
After killing his mother and sister and ritualistically arranging their bodies as a sacrifice to Satan, a Devil worshipper recites the Lords Prayer backwards as it is written on the wall in a room filled with candles and Satanic imagery. He then commits suicide by throwing himself onto an athame in an attempt to ensure that he is eternally damned. What follows next is a near-death experience where the clinically dead killer flies through tunnels of light, eventually arriving at a gaping, tentacle-like being of light who, after flashing through scenes of the recent brutal murders, darkens and casts the killer's soul down into Hell.

Hatch Harrison is driving home from his family's lakeside cabin with his wife Lindsey and daughter Regina. They collide with a truck and, after Regina manages to escape, the car plummets down a ravine into a fast-flowing river. Lindsey believes she watched her husband die.

At the hospital, Hatch is revived by Dr. Jonas Nyebern, who runs a specialist resuscitation team. During the procedure, a nurse warns Dr. Nyebern about bringing back a patient who has been gone for so long, saying "We both remember what happened last time." While he is on the operating table, Hatch experiences visions of the same tunnels of light as the killer, but upon arriving for judgment is slowly floated into a surreal heavenly scene, where he sees his young daughter Samantha who died years before in a car accident. Hatch then enters Heaven and is merged into the light of a great angel until he is revived.

Hatch begins to experience disturbing visions while he sleeps which involve him seemingly murdering young women, when in fact he is actually seeing through the eyes of the real killer. As the killer looks down at his young blonde victim dead in shrubs at the side of a road, Hatch sees the same vision; in his vision the young blonde woman becomes his daughter Regina. The killer, who can also see through the eyes of Hatch, sees Regina.

Hatch realizes that the murders are actually happening when the women he sees in his visions are announced as missing in news reports. Regina sneaks out of the house to meet some friends and they go to a dingy alternative night club, where the killer also happens to be. He recognizes Regina from his vision and introduces himself as "Vassago". Regina's friends interrupt and tell Vassago to leave them alone. Hatch, asleep at home, sees all this happening in his visions.

The next day, Hatch accuses Regina of being at the night club, which she denies. Hatch scares Regina as he attempts to warn her about Vassago. He is told that he is experiencing mental problems by his family, his psychiatrist, and the police. He visits a psychic who confirms his beliefs and tells him that he is tied to Vassago by a "coincidence of fate", and that Vassago is also seeing through Hatch's eyes. Vassago sees this and then visits the psychic at her home and kills her.

Hatch discovers that Vassago's real name is Jeremy Nyebern, and is the son of Dr. Nyebern. He confronts Dr. Nyebern, who explains that Jeremy is psychotic and that after murdering his mother and sister and attempting suicide, was revived by his resuscitation team. Jeremy kidnaps Regina and takes her to his hideaway beneath an abandoned amusement park where he has been building a "monument to hell". He ties Regina up at the top. 

Dr. Nyebern finds Jeremy and tries to talk him down, but Jeremy kills him. Hatch and Lindsey find them, and a fight ensues between Hatch and Jeremy. The demonic soul within Jeremy emerges and calls itself Vassago while Hatch watches. An angelic spirit resembling Hatch's daughter Samantha then emerges from him and collides with Vassago in a battle of good vs evil. Hatch manages to kill an attacking Jeremy while the spirit kills Vassago. With his family safe, he exits the park with them.

A post-credits scene shows Jeremy being pulled in to be revived. Jeremy wakes up, reaches for a scalpel on the medical table, and slits a nurse's throat. Hatch wakes up in his bed, realizing he was only dreaming. Hatch and Lindsey laugh and go back to sleep.

Cast
 Jeff Goldblum as Hatch Harrison / Uriel
 Christine Lahti as Lindsey Harrison
 Alicia Silverstone as Regina Harrison
 Jeremy Sisto as Vassago / Jeremy Nyebern
 Alfred Molina as Dr. Jonas Nyebern
 Rae Dawn Chong as Rose Orwetto
 Kenneth Welsh as Detective Breech

Production
The film was an international co-production film between The United States and Canada. Filming took place in 1994 in Britannia Beach, British Columbia, Canada. Vassago's hideaway was constructed in the abandoned Britannia Mine.

Reception
The film received negative reviews from critics, with Rotten Tomatoes reporting that 12 out of the 15 reviews they tallied were negative for a score of 20% and a certification of "rotten".Mick LaSalle of the San Francisco Chronicle gave the film a poor review, but stated that Goldblum's performance "makes a tedious film intermittently tolerable." Film critic/historian Leonard Maltin characterized the movie as a "bomb" and added, "This goes nowhere for nearly two interminable hours." Roger Ebert of The Chicago Sun-Times gave the film a rare positive review, 3 stars out of a possible 4. He characterized it as a standard fare horror film that accomplishes its modest goals via good performances by a talented cast. He wrote: "Look, I'm not saying this is a great movie, or even a distinguished one. I'm saying: You want horror, you want psychic abandon, you want Rae Dawn Chong reading Jeff Goldblum's Tarot cards and not liking what she sees, you see this movie, you get your money's worth."

Koontz was reportedly dissatisfied with the film. According to Rita Kempley of The Washington Post, "Koontz hates the movie so much he tried to force TriStar to remove his name from the credits." In addition, according to the San Francisco Chronicle's Walter Addiego, Koontz was so dissatisfied with Hideaway that he would only allow a film adaptation of his novel Phantoms to be made if he was allowed to approve the final version of the film.

On his own website, Koontz states that pre-production of the film was promising under Mike Medavoy, who wanted to preserve Koontz's vision for the story and ordered a rewrite of the first script at Koontz's request. However, Medavoy was removed from the film and new production staff did not communicate with Koontz about the finished film, which departed drastically from his novel. Koontz ultimately resorted to legal means to get his name removed from the title of the film and from major advertising, but was unable to get his name removed from the credits. He also writes that he sent several letters to the Japanese CEO of the parent company of Universal/MCA, which had the rights to the film, requesting that his name be removed.

Box office
Hideaway made $12,201,255 at the US and Canadian box office and $14 million internationally for a worldwide gross of $26.2 million.

References

External links

1995 films
1995 horror films
1990s English-language films
1990s serial killer films
American horror films
American serial killer films
Canadian horror films
Canadian serial killer films
Canadian slasher films
Films about child abduction in the United States
Films about Satanism
Films about telepathy
Films based on American horror novels
Films based on works by Dean Koontz
Films directed by Brett Leonard
Films scored by Trevor Jones
Films set in Washington (state)
Films shot in British Columbia
Films with screenplays by Andrew Kevin Walker
Matricide in fiction
Fiction about near-death experiences
Patricide in fiction
Sororicide in fiction
TriStar Pictures films
1990s American films
1990s Canadian films